Michael ("Mike") Colin Gratton (born 28 November 1954) is a male former elite long distance runner from Canterbury, Kent, England.

Athletics career
A member of the Kent athletics club Invicta AC, Gratton is a past winner of the London Marathon. He won the 1983 London Marathon in a time of 2:09:43, a time which places him 14th on the UK all-time marathon list.

He represented England and won a bronze medal in the marathon event (2:12:06), at the 1982 Commonwealth Games in Brisbane, Queensland, Australia.

Personal life
He now runs a sports holiday company called 2:09 Events.  He has gained a recent following through a well-known online forum on the Runners World website called “Hard Training with Mike Gratton.”

Competition record

References 

  An excerpt from ‘Hard Training with Mike Gratton’
 Invicta AC website
 2:09 Events company website
 Power of 10 UK Marathon Rankings

1954 births
Living people
English male marathon runners
Commonwealth Games medallists in athletics
Commonwealth Games bronze medallists for England
Athletes (track and field) at the 1982 Commonwealth Games
World Athletics Championships athletes for Great Britain
London Marathon male winners
Medallists at the 1982 Commonwealth Games